Hypocrita drucei is a moth of the family Erebidae. It was described by Schaus in 1910. It is found in Costa Rica, Guatemala and Panama.

References

Hypocrita
Moths described in 1910